Hesar Juq (also Romanized as Ḩeşār Jūq) is a village in Mazul Rural District, in the Central District of Nishapur County, Razavi Khorasan Province, Iran. At the 2006 census, its population was 419, in 99 families.

References 

Populated places in Nishapur County